Haiti competed at the 2011 Pan American Games in Guadalajara, Mexico from October 14 to 30, 2011. Haiti's team consists of 11 athletes in five sports.

Athletics 

Haiti sent a team of eight athletes.

Men

Track and road events

Field events

Women

Field events

Judo

Haiti has qualified one athlete in the 52 kg women's category.

Women

Repechage Rounds

Taekwondo

Haiti have received a wildcard to send one male taekwondo athlete.

Men

Tennis
 
Haiti has qualified one male tennis athlete.

Men

Weightlifting

Haiti has qualified a team of one male athlete.

References

Nations at the 2011 Pan American Games
Pan
2011